CRD is a 2016 drama-romance Indian film by National Award Winning Director Kranti Kanade written with Yuva Sahitya Akademi Award Winning Dramatist Dharmakirti Sumant. Set in the world of College Theatre, it probes fascism and fierce competition in arts.

Plot 
A Young Dramatist rebels against his fascist Tutor to form his troop of misfits – aiming to win a prestigious theatre competition and trying to find the hardest thing of all: his voice. Inspired by real life event 'Purushottam' Theatre Competition in Pune, India.

Cast 
 Mrinmayee Godbole as Persis
 Vinay Sharma as Mayank
 Saurabh Saraswat as Chetan
 Abhay Mahajan as Netra
 Isha Keskar as Dipti
 Geetika Tyagi as Veena
 Mohit Takalkar as Senior

Production 
The preparation and improvisation of the actors went on for 4 months before the principal photography began in November 2014 and continued over the next six months resulting in 63 days of shooting. The editing took eight months and the music and sound design took further six months. The film was entirely shot on locations in Pune. It was executive and line produced by Ashwini Paranjape for Kanade Films and Chaitra Arts. Director of photography was Daniel Katz whose short film Curfew had won Oscar.

Critical response 
CRD has received favourable critical reception around the world.

Robert Abele in The Los Angeles Times says,
"Indian film 'CRD' enchanting, audacious, indefinable and infectious." Sheri Linden in The Hollywood Reporter says, "CRD is entrancing, vibrant, irreverent and category-defying! Kanadé an assured visual stylist!" LA Weekly says, "Allusive, elusive and by turns funny, romantic and tragic, CRD is a film tuned to the pitch of the artist's heart." ScreenAnarchy says, "CRD, An Ethereal Exercise In Art.” Film critic Namrata Joshi, in The Hindu says, “Subversive and fearless, Kanadé breaks all rules of filmmaking in creating CRD, which boldly goes where no Indian film has gone before.” Author and critic Naman Ramachandran says, "This astonishing film heralds the arrival of a bold new voice in world cinema where all limits are breached and boundaries crossed. Be prepared for a breathtaking journey, the likes of which you've never been on before." Saibal Chatterjee, NDTV says “A path-breaking film. Refreshingly original and delightfully whimsical. CRD is classy, satisfying and magnificently inventive package.” Nandini Ramnath, Scroll says “Outstanding, a superbly performed drama about theatre art and life." Trisha Gupta, Firstpost says “Masterful and sharp, CRD displays both political and aesthetic courage, constantly moving between lyrical intensity and playful subversion.” Rahul Desai, Film Companion says “CRD is hypnotic. The less sense it makes, the more we can’t stop watching it (Roger Ebert’s words apply here). May be this is what auteurs are about.” Reza Noorani in The Times of India says "CRD is brave with a twisted sense of humour." Business Standard says "CRD redefines cinema space." Hindustan Times says "CRD is vibrant and appealing." Shubhra Gupta in The Indian Express says "CRD is spectacular and refreshing in its willingness to go down paths less trodden." CRD is mentioned in Scroll's list of "The movies of the decade that dared to dream differently."

Further reading 
https://deadline.com/2016/10/exclusive-trailer-for-acclaimed-indian-drama-crd-1201837045/
https://www.tribuneindia.com/news/archive/entertainment/big-little-films-get-going-485010

References

External links 
 

2016 films
Indian independent films
Indian romantic drama films
Films shot in India
Films shot in Mumbai
2010s Hindi-language films
2016 romantic drama films
2016 independent films
2010s English-language films